Just a Little Bit may refer to:

 "Just a Little Bit" (Blue Cheer song)
 "Just a Little Bit" (Kids of 88 song)
 "Just a Little Bit" (Mutya Buena song)
 "Just a Little Bit" (Rosco Gordon song), recorded by many artists
 "Just a Lil Bit", a song by 50 Cent
 "Just a Little Bit", a song by Christina Milian from So Amazin'
 "Just a Little Bit", a song by Magnum from Sleepwalking
 "Just a Little Bit", a song by Maria Mena from Mellow
 "Just a Little Bit", a song by Stone Roses from Garage Flower
 "I Want Your Lovin' (Just a Little Bit)", a song by Curtis Hairston
 "Wiggle It (Just A Little Bit)", a song by 2 in a Room
 Just a Little Bit, a series of romance novels by Eileen Wilks

See also 
 Lil Bit (disambiguation)
 "Ooh Aah... Just a Little Bit", a song by Gina G
Just a Little (disambiguation)
"A Little Bit", song by Jessica Simpson